Old Marlboro Road (also known as Old Marlborough Road) is a historic road and the name of a poem about the road by Henry David Thoreau, published in his work, Walking. Old Marlboro Road currently runs through Concord, Sudbury, and Maynard, Massachusetts, United States.

History
The road likely originated as an Indian path, being the "shortest course through the domain of Tantamous (Maynard) to Occogoogansett (Marlboro)." Colonists settled along the road in the seventeenth century. During the Revolutionary War, ammunition wagons traveled along Old Marlboro/Concord Road to provide George Washington arms for his defense of Trenton. In the nineteenth century, Transcendentalist Henry David Thoreau lived near the disused road in Concord, and frequently walked along it, before writing a poem entitled "The Old Marlborough Road."

Parts of the route exist as road anew, from Concord, near Emerson Hospital, into Sudbury and then Maynard, where it terminates at the Assabet River National Wildlife Refuge. The route continues in the Refuge as Winterberry Way and Powerline Trail. Beyond the Refuge, the route continues as roads by various names, ending as Concord Road in Marlborough.

References

Concord, Massachusetts
Maynard, Massachusetts
Sudbury, Massachusetts
Roads in Massachusetts
Transportation in Middlesex County, Massachusetts